Oxylobium cordifolium, commonly known as the heart-leaved shaggy pea, is a species of flowering plant in the family Fabaceae and is endemic to New South Wales. It is a small, prostrate shrub with long, wiry branches, heart-shaped leaves and orange-red flowers.

Description
Flowering occurs from spring to early summer.

Taxonomy
Oxylobium cordifolium was first formally described in 1807 by Henry Cranke Andrews and the description was published in The Botanist's Repository for New, and Rare Plants. The specific epithet (cordifolium) means "heart leaved".

Distribution and habitat
Heart-leaved shaggy pea grows on damp, sandy soils in heath and coastal headlands south of Sydney, Tumut and Conjola districts.

References

Mirbelioids
Fabales of Australia
Flora of New South Wales
Taxa named by Henry Cranke Andrews